Shekarabad (also Romanized as Shekarābād and Shokrābād) is a village in Khorramdasht Rural District, in the Central District of Kuhbanan County, Kerman Province, Iran. At the 2006 census, its population was 90, in 26 families.

References 

Populated places in Kuhbanan County